ZPR May refer to:

 Xánica Zapotec, ISO 639-3 language code zpr
 Preston Road tube station, London, England, National Rail station code ZPR
 The LITTLE ZIPPER (ZPR) protein, the first microprotein discovered in plants
 ZPR Media Group, a media company in Poland
 Zero power reactors, identifier of several research nuclear reactors at Argonne National Laboratory; see List of nuclear research reactors#United States